Niu Wenbin (born 20 January 1991) is a Chinese racewalking athlete. Representing China at the 2019 World Athletics Championships, he placed fourth in the men's 50 kilometres walk.

References

External links
 

Chinese male racewalkers
1991 births
Living people
World Athletics Championships athletes for China
Universiade medalists in athletics (track and field)
Universiade silver medalists for China